Störner is a mountain of Hesse, Germany.

Mountains of Hesse

de:Damshäuser Kuppen#Rimberg-Gruppe